Yek Borji may refer to:

Yek Borji, Khuzestan
Yek Borji, Lorestan